USS LST-141 was an  built for the United States Navy in World War II. Like most of the ships of her class, she was not named and known only by her designation.

LST-141 was laid down on 24 November 1943 at Ambridge, Pennsylvania, by the American Bridge Company; launched on 16 January 1944; and commissioned on 16 February 1944.
 
During World War II, LST-141 was assigned to the European Theatre. She sailed across the Atlantic as part of Convoy UGS 36 in April 1944, and took part in the invasion of southern France in August and September 1944.
 
On 3 December 1944, LST-141 was damaged when she ran aground at Bizerte, Tunisia.

On 5 December, while towing , LST-141 encountered a gale off Palermo, Sicily.

Upon her return to the United States, she was decommissioned on 18 December 1945 and struck from the Navy List on 7 February 1946. On 25 May 1948, the ship was sold to Hughes Bros. Inc., of New York, for scrapping.
 
LST-141 earned one battle star for World War II service.

References

External links
 

 

World War II amphibious warfare vessels of the United States
Ships built in Ambridge, Pennsylvania
1944 ships
LST-1-class tank landing ships of the United States Navy